The Gisborne City Vintage Railway (GCVR) Incorporated is a railway preservation group based in Gisborne, New Zealand. Operating on part of the northern section of the mothballed Palmerston North–Gisborne Line, the group was founded in 1985. GCVR runs charter and public excursions, mainly from October to June.

From 1986, the group began restoration of WA 165, the first locomotive built at NZR's Hillside Workshops in 1897. The locomotive was returned to steam in 2000. The group then began running excursions from Gisborne.

Lease 
In 2012 KiwiRail announced that it was mothballing the Napier-Gisborne section of the Palmerston North-Gisborne Line, due to the cost of repairing storm damage to the line. This put the future of Gisborne City Vintage Railway in question. In 2013 the group's president, Geoff Joyce, told the Gisborne District Council that the group was preparing a business case to take over the lease of the line from KiwiRail. The plan included leasing 34 km of track from Gisborne to Beach Loop. In September 2015, Gisborne City Vintage Railway signed a License to Occupy agreement with KiwiRail, which enables them to lease the line from Gisborne to Beach Loop. In addition to paying the lease, they also have to maintain that section of the line including all of the bridges.

Repairs and maintenance 
As at 1 January 2021, damage to the track at Beach Loop was preventing Gisborne City Vintage Railway from operating south of Muriwai.  In December 2022, the Eastland Group announced that the Tūranganui River railway bridge, used by the train to collect cruise ship passengers from the port was no longer considered safe. As an interim measure, a bus was arranged to take cruise ship passengers from the port to connect with the train. Later that month, the Gisborne City Vintage Railway reported that it aimed to raise $800,000 to undertake repairs and maintenance on the line to Muriwai.

See also
 NZR WA class
 Locomotives of New Zealand

References

External links 

 Gisborne City Vintage Railway official web site.
 From ruins to steam YouTube video clip

Heritage railways in New Zealand
Rail transport in the Gisborne District
3 ft 6 in gauge railways in New Zealand
Tourist attractions in the Gisborne District